The 1943 Campeonato Nacional de Fútbol Profesional was Chilean first tier’s 11th season. Unión Española was the tournament’s champion, winning its first title.

Scores

Standings

Topscorer

References

External links
ANFP 
RSSSF Chile 1943

Primera División de Chile seasons
Primera
Chile